Jonathan Earle Arnold (February 4, 1814June 2, 1869) was an American lawyer and politician.  He was a member of the Council of the Wisconsin Territory and district attorney of Milwaukee County.

Biography
Arnold was born in Woonsocket, Rhode Island on  February 4, 1814. He graduated from Brown University before moving to Milwaukee, Wisconsin in 1836. Arnold died on June 2, 1869.

Career
Arnold served in the Wisconsin Territorial Council from 1840 to 1841 as a member of the Whig Party. During the Wisconsin Territory period, he also served as Milwaukee County District Attorney and ran unsuccessfully for congress.  In 1860, after Wisconsin had been admitted to the Union, he ran again for the United States House of Representatives, this time in Wisconsin's 1st congressional district as a Democrat. He lost to incumbent John F. Potter.

As a lawyer, he successfully defended Judge Levi Hubbell in his 1853 impeachment trial, and he was a member of the legal team for William A. Barstow in the contest over the results of the 1855 Wisconsin gubernatorial election.

References

Politicians from Woonsocket, Rhode Island
Politicians from Milwaukee
Members of the Wisconsin Territorial Legislature
19th-century American politicians
Wisconsin Whigs
Wisconsin Democrats
Wisconsin lawyers
Brown University alumni
1814 births
1869 deaths
19th-century American lawyers